José Avelino y Dira (August 5, 1890 – July 21, 1986),  often referred to as Jose Avelino Sr. to distinguish him from his son with the same name, was the first President of the Senate of the Third Republic of the Philippines and the second President of the Liberal Party. He was Senate President pro tempore to President Manuel Quezon prior to the establishment of the Commonwealth.

Early life and career
Avelino was born in a town called Calbayog in Samar to Ildefonsa Dira and Baltazar Avelino. Avelino was educated at the Ateneo de Manila where he received his Bachelor of Arts degree and the University of Santo Tomas where he graduated with his Bachelor of Laws. Calbayog became a City in 1948 at Avelino's instance, when as President of the Senate he pulled together three contiguous municipalities (Oquendo, Calbayog and Tinambacan) and made it into the 19th city of the Philippines, July 15, 1948, the date President Elpidio Quirino signed Republic Act 328.

Personal life
Avelino was married to Enriqueta Casal and had four sons (Jose Jr., Enrique, Antonio, Baltazar II) and has one daughter named Pilar. He is the great-grandfather of actor Paulo Avelino.

National Politics
He served concurrently as Secretary of Labor and Secretary of Public Works and Transportation under President Manuel L. Quezon. As Secretary of Labor, Avelino accomplished something unprecedented in the Philippines and perhaps the world – he unified the labor unions by organizing them into two commissions: the National Commission of Labor (NCL) and the National Commission of Peasants (NCP) – and he was designated chairman of these two Commissions. To quote Manila Bulletin: "The new Secretary of Labor José Avelino became not merely the head of the Department of Labor in the government but the head of labor organization, the head of labor in fact."

Avelino is known as the Father of the Philippine Workmen’s Compensation Law; one of the most famous bills which he authored during his term in Senate, which focused on creating a contingency insurance fund for workers as a way to protect the workers from the various economic problems that plagued the post-war economy.

Avelino also founded the first labor union in Eastern Visayas, Gremio Obrero de Stevedores and considered to be a founding member of the Liberal Party. He was instrumental in the passage of the Social Security System and pushed for the establishment of public high schools in every province in the Philippines. The final office held by Avelino before retiring was Ambassador Plenipotentiary under President Elpidio Quirino.

An LP stalwart, Avelino was infamously quoted as saying "What are we in power for?" which was said during a party caucus in Malacañang. The whole statement being:

"Why did you have to order an investigation Honorable Mr. President? If you cannot permit abuses, you must at least tolerate them. What are we in power for? We are not hypocrites. Why should we pretend to be saints when in reality we are not? We are not angels. When we die we will all go to hell. It is better to be in hell because in that place there are no investigations, no secretary of justice, no secretary of the interior to go after us."

The above account is disputed by historian Quintin Doroquez.  Doroquez claims that Avelino was willfully misquoted as corrupt by Celso Cabrera, a newsreporter who did not speak Spanish. Doroquez claims that Congressman Faustino Tobia of Ilocos Norte confessed to the Avelino family later that the entire quote was fabricated and that the original context of Avelino's comment at the said party caucus on January 15, 1949 was the failure of the Quirino administration to deal with the problems of the country.  According to Doroquez, Congressman Tobia offered the following paraphrase as closer to what Avelino actually said in Spanish at the meeting.

"Señor Presidente, ¿no es la verdad que sin hacerlos vigorosamente es traicionar y negar esencialmente nuestros deberes como sirvientes públicos? ¿Para que esta el nuestro mandato del pueblo?"

Doroquez provided a translation of Congressman Tobia's paraphrase.

"Mr. President, is it not the truth that not addressing vigorously these problems [i.e., of losing the Liberal Party's insight into the postwar reconstruction, the country’s peasant plight that is fueling the Huk's insurgency, and the moral discipline of those who use their position or influence in government to advance their selfish ends, like appointing less qualified men from the opposition party] is to betray and negate fundamentally our duties as public servants? What for is our mandate from the people?"

In any case, the quote "What are we in power for?" was the quote attributed to Avelino and reported in The Manila Chronicle which was owned by the Lopez family, the family of then-Senator Fernando Lopez who later would be chosen as Quirino's running mate and be elected as his Vice President.

Avelino ran for being President of the Philippines in the 1949 election, where he became third in a race between incumbent president Elpidio Quirino and former president José P. Laurel. Avelino tried to divide the Liberal Party votes for Quirino by declaring his faction as the other wing of the Liberal Party, but the latter still won with 50.93% of the votes. Avelino garnered a mere 11.85%. His vice presidential mate, Vicente Francisco, garnered a far lower percentage (1.73%).

Later life
Avelino retired from public life and devoted himself to the practice of law. Avelino died at the age of 95 on July 21, 1986.

References

External links
Biography of Jose Avelino - Senate of the Philippines
Calbayog Ko page about Jose Avelino
Quintin Lambino Doroquez's biographical article about Jose Avelino

1890 births
1986 deaths
People from Calbayog
Nacionalista Party politicians
Liberal Party (Philippines) politicians
Secretaries of Public Works and Highways of the Philippines
Secretaries of Transportation of the Philippines
Secretaries of Labor and Employment of the Philippines
Presidents of the Senate of the Philippines
Presidents pro tempore of the Senate of the Philippines
Senators of the 2nd Congress of the Philippines
Senators of the 1st Congress of the Philippines
Senators of the 10th Philippine Legislature
Senators of the 9th Philippine Legislature
Senators of the 8th Philippine Legislature
Members of the House of Representatives of the Philippines from Samar (province)
Candidates in the 1949 Philippine presidential election
Ateneo de Manila University alumni
University of the Philippines alumni
University of Santo Tomas alumni
Quezon administration cabinet members
Presidents of the Liberal Party of the Philippines
Members of the Philippine Legislature